Eremiaphila kheychi is a species of praying mantis in the family Eremiaphilidae that is found in Egypt.

See also
List of mantis genera and species

References

Eremiaphila
Mantodea of Africa
Insects described in 1835